Coelocarpum is a genus of flowering plants belonging to the family Verbenaceae.

Its native range is Northeastern Tropical Africa, Western Indian Ocean.

Species:

Coelocarpum africanum 
Coelocarpum glandulosum 
Coelocarpum haggierense 
Coelocarpum humbertii 
Coelocarpum madagascariensis 
Coelocarpum socotranum 
Coelocarpum swinglei

References

Verbenaceae
Verbenaceae genera